The 7.65×25mm Borchardt cartridge was designed by Georg Johann Luger for use in Hugo Borchardt's Borchardt C-93 pistol. It was the first successful rimless pistol cartridge.

History and design
With a rimless, bottlenecked case using smokeless powder, the 7.65×25mm Borchardt adapted features of the 7.92 mm cartridge used in the 1888 pattern M/88 rifle, essentially scaling it down for use in a pistol.

The Feederle brothers (Fidel, Friedrich, and Josef) used the Borchardt cartridge in their design for the Mauser C96 pistol. The Borchardt cartridge thus was the basis for the 7.63×25mm Mauser cartridge, which used the same dimensions but was eventually loaded with a stronger powder charge. By extension, the Borchardt cartridge was also the basis for the 7.62×25mm Tokarev cartridge, which was developed directly from the Mauser round using an even stronger powder charge.

The 7.65×25mm Borchardt was also the basis of the 7.65×21mm Parabellum and 9×19mm Parabellum cartridges developed for the Luger pistol. The shorter case length of the 7.65×21mm Parabellum allowed for improvements in the Luger pistol, including a shorter stroke in the toggle mechanism as well as a smaller grip.  The same shorter length of cartridge was maintained when the design transitioned to the 9×19mm Parabellum.

The 7.65×25mm Borchardt was manufactured by DWM in Germany, Eley Brothers and Kynoch in Great Britain, and Remington Arms - Union Metallic Cartridge Co. and Winchester in the United States. In many instances, the ammunition was packaged in boxes that read "For Borchardt and Mauser Automatic Pistols".

Other firearms

The 7.65×25mm Borchardt was one of the chamberings of the Maxim-Silverman 1896 Pistol, a self-loading pistol designed and patented by Hiram Maxim and his assistant Louis Silverman.

References

 Barnes, Frank C. Cartridges of the World, 3rd Edition. Digest Books, 1972, pp. 152, 177. .
 Goertz, Joachim and Sturgess, Geoffrey The Borchardt & Luger Automatic Pistols, Brad Simpson Publishing and G.L. Sturgess, 2010 and 2011, pp. 104–138, .
 Belford, James N. and Dunlap, Jack The Mauser Self-Loading Pistol, Borden Publishing Company, 1969, p. 16, .

External links

Pistol and rifle cartridges